Anabel Gutiérrez Aicua (5 September 1931 – 21 August 2022) was a Mexican actress and comedian. Among her most memorable works is her participation in the film School for Tramps (1955), as well as her appearances on the program Chespirito (1970) playing the character of Doña Espotaverderona in some sketches.

Biography
Anabel Gutiérrez Aicua was born in Mexico City on 5 September 1931.

After making two films as an extra in 1949, El Diablo no es Tan Diablo, where she played with a yo-yo and La liga de las muchachas, Gutiérrez began to be offered larger parts. One of the first was in the 1950 film Deseada, where she starred opposite Dolores del Río in an older sister / younger sister love triangle with Jorge Mistral. The film had 5 nominations for Ariel Awards and won for best musical score.  That same year, she also acted in the film, Azahares para tu boda with Fernando Soler, Marga Lopez, Sara Garcia and Joaquin Pardavé.

With that recognition, other work followed and soon Gutiérrez became known as a young teenaged star. She made several movies in quick succession, but her most memorable roles were for Muchachas de uniforme (1951), Rostros olvidados (1952), and Escuela de vagabundos (1954), which for each, she was nominated for the Ariel Award for Best Youth Actor. She won the award for Escuela de vagabundos in 1956.

Some of her other memorable roles opposite renowned Mexican actors include: La visita que no tocó el timbre (1954) with Miroslava; Angelitos del trapecio (1959) with Viruta y Capulina; El coyote emplumado (1983) with María Elena Velasco and her last film was in 1999 for the film La paloma de Marsella with Germán Robles.

In the late 1960s, Gutiérrez began working in television and developed a working relationship with Gómez Bolaños Roberto that would bring her second fame. Her first series with him was in El Ciudadano Gómez but the work that made her an icon is Doña Espotaverderona, the mother of La Chimoltrufia, in the television program Chespirito.

Personal life and death
Gutiérrez was the mother of the actress Amairani. She died on 21 August 2022, a few weeks before her 91st birthday.

Awards
 Muchachas de uniforme (1952), nominated for the Ariel Award for Best Youth Actor
 Rostros olvidados (1953), nominated for the Ariel Award for Best Youth Actor
 Escuela de vagabundos (1956), won the Ariel Award for Best Youth Actor

Filmography

Films 

El diablo no es tan diablo (1949) – Amiga de Yoyo (uncredited)
La liga de las muchachas (1950) – (uncredited)
Azahares para tu boda (1950) – Margarita
Al son del mambo (1950) – Bailarina
Desired (1951) – Nicte
 Girls in Uniform (1951)
Rostros olvidados (1952) – Julieta
El Ruiseñor del barrio (1952) – Hija de Neron
Huracán Ramírez (1953)
Women Who Work (1953) – Gloria Esparza
Beatriz no te ofendas (1953) – Margarita
Seven Women (1953)
Caribeña (1955)
Venganza en el circo (1954) – Stella
The Three Elenas (1954) – Elena, nieta
A Tailored Gentleman (1954) – Luisa 
La visita que no tocó el timbre (1954) – Margot
School for Tramps (1954) – Laura Valverde
Amor de lejos (1955) – Irma
Llamas contra el viento (1956) – Laura
El ratón (1956) – Diana
Las aventuras de Pito Pérez (1957) – Chucha
Música en la noche (1958)
Angelitos del trapecio (1959) – Lina
Quietos todos (1959) – Rosita
His First Love (1960)
Los resbalosos (1959) – Carmela
Los resbalosos (1960) – Carmela
Discoteca es amor (1979)
El coyote emplumado (1983) – Gringa borracha
La paloma de Marsella (1999)

Television 

 Variedades de media noche (1958)
 México 1900 (1964)
 Cárcel de mujeres (1968)
 Chespirito (1989–1995) – Doña Espotaverderona / Socorro / and others
 Alguna vez tendremos alas (1997) Bernardita
 Locura de amor (2000) – Corina
 Primer amor, a mil por hora (2000) – Ella 
 Carita de Ángel (2000) – Pordiosera
 XHDRBZ (2002)
 Niños que miran al cielo (2002)
 Hada de cabaret (2002)
 Despojo (2002)
 Bajo la misma piel (2003) – Rosita
 Recuerdos que atormentan (2003)
 Días de suerte (2005)
 La Enfermera De La Muerte (2005) 
 Mujer casos de la vida real (2002–2005) – Lupita
 Lola, érase una vez (2007) – Madre de Monserrat
 La Rosa de Guadalupe (2013, episode: "La burra")

References

External links 
 

1931 births
2022 deaths
Chespirito actors
Mexican actresses
Mexican television actresses
Actresses from Mexico City
Mexican film actresses